Cann River  is a town in the East Gippsland region of Victoria, Australia. The town is located on the Cann River at the junction of the Princes Highway and the Monaro Highway, in the Shire of East Gippsland. At the 2016 census, Cann River had a population of 194 people.

Features
The town is close to the Lind, Coopracambra, Croajingolong, and Alfred national parks, and is a popular stopping point for travellers between Melbourne and Sydney using the Princes Highway route. Public transport services are provided to the town by V/Line, a coach service between Canberra and Bairnsdale, that operates three times per week.

The post office opened on 1 July 1890.

Population
In the 2016 Census, there were 194 people in Cann River. 85.3% of people were born in Australia and 86.3% of people spoke only English at home.

Gallery

See also
 Cann River East Branch

References

External links

Australian Places - Cann River
 

Towns in Victoria (Australia)
Shire of East Gippsland